Jason Dharmaraj was an Anglican bishop in the Church of South India: he was the Bishop of Tirunelveli from 1985 to 1999.

References

Anglican bishops of Tinnevelly
20th-century Anglican bishops in India
Indian bishops
Indian Christian religious leaders